

182001–182100 

|-id=044
| 182044 Ryschkewitsch ||  || Michael Ryschkewitsch (born 1951) of the Johns Hopkins University Applied Physics Laboratory (APL), served as the NASA Headquarters Chief Engineer and then as the Head of the APL Space Department for the New Horizons mission to Pluto. || 
|}

182101–182200 

|-id=122
| 182122 Sepan ||  || Rebecca L. H. Sepan (born 1977), a senior mission operations analyst at the Johns Hopkins University Applied Physics Laboratory, served as a Flight Controller for the New Horizons mission to Pluto. || 
|}

182201–182300 

|-id=262
| 182262 Solène || 2001 HA || Soléne Delavier (born 1996), the daughter of Anne-Véronique, wife of astronomer Michel Hernandez, one of the observers at the Observatory of Saint-Veran in France, where this minor planet was discovered. || 
|}

182301–182400 

|-bgcolor=#f2f2f2
| colspan=4 align=center | 
|}

182401–182500 

|-bgcolor=#f2f2f2
| colspan=4 align=center | 
|}

182501–182600 

|-id=590
| 182590 Vladisvujnovic ||  || Vladis Vujnovic (born 1933) is a professor of astronomy and physics at the University of Zagreb, a pianist, author of numerous astronomy textbooks and other publications, and a major contributor to the development of astronomy and astrophysics in Croatia. || 
|-id=591
| 182591 Mocescobedo ||  || Cuauhtemoc Escobedo (born 1962), an American jazz music educator from Seattle, Washington, who received the 2006 Golden Apple Award and admitted to the Seattle Jazz Hall of Fame. || 
|-id=592
| 182592 Jolana ||  || Jolana Kürtiova (born 1963), wife of Slovak amateur astronomer Stefan Kürti, who was involved with the discovery and early astrometric measurements of this minor planet || 
|}

182601–182700 

|-bgcolor=#f2f2f2
| colspan=4 align=center | 
|}

182701–182800 

|-bgcolor=#f2f2f2
| colspan=4 align=center | 
|}

182801–182900 

|-bgcolor=#f2f2f2
| colspan=4 align=center | 
|}

182901–183000 

|-bgcolor=#f2f2f2
| colspan=4 align=center | 
|}

References 

182001-183000